MLG Counter-Strike: Global Offensive Major Championship: Columbus, also referred to as MLG Columbus 2016 was the eighth Counter-Strike: Global Offensive (CS:GO) Major Championship held by Major League Gaming (MLG) throughout March 29 to April 3, 2016, in the Nationwide Arena in Columbus, Ohio, United States. It was the first CS:GO Major in North America as well as the first run by Major League Gaming, who previously ran an exhibition CS:GO tournament at X Games Aspen 2015. It was also the very first CS:GO major in which ESL or DreamHack was not the organizer. It was announced on February 23, 2016, that MLG Columbus 2016 would be the first Counter-Strike tournament with a $1,000,000 prize pool.

The playoffs had eight teams. Astralis, Fnatic, Luminosity Gaming, Natus Vincere, Ninjas in Pyjamas, and Virtus.pro were returning Legends. Counter Logic Gaming and Team Liquid were new Legends as FaZe Clan and Team EnVyUs had their Legends status taken away after failing to make the top eight. In the grand finals, Luminosity Gaming, which defeated Virtus.pro and Team Liquid, faced off against Natus Vincere, which defeated Ninjas in Pyjamas and Astralis. Luminosity Gaming won 2–0 as the underdog for its first major title and fifty percent of the $1,000,000 prize pool; in addition, it became the first non-European team to win a major title.

Format
The top eight finishers at DreamHack Open Cluj-Napoca 2015 ("Legends") received direct invitations to Columbus. In addition, eight other teams ("Challengers") emerged from the MLG Columbus 2016 Main Qualifier.

Teams were split up into four groups, and all group matches were best-of-ones with the exception of the final decider match, deciding the last playoff spot. The highest seed would play the lowest seed in each group and the second and third seeds would play against each other. The winner of those two matches would play each other to determine which team moved on to the playoff stage, while the losers of the first round of matches also played. The loser of the lower match was then eliminated from the tournament. With one team advanced and one eliminated, the two remaining teams would play a best-of-three elimination match for the second playoff spot. This format is known as the GSL format, named for the Global StarCraft II League.

The playoffs bracket consisted of eight teams, two from each group. All of these matches were best-of-three, single elimination. Teams advanced in the bracket until a winner was decided.

Map pool
The seven-map pool did not change from Cluj-Napoca 2015. Before each best-of-one match in the group stage, teams alternated banning maps until five maps had been banned. One of the two remaining maps was randomly selected, and the team that that did not get a third ban then selected which side it wanted to start on. In all best-of-three series, each team first banned a map, leaving a five-map pool. Each team then chose a map, with the opposing team selecting which side they wanted to start on for their opponent's map choice. The two map picks were the first two maps in the best-of-three. If the series were to require a third map, the map was randomly selected from the three remaining maps.

Main Qualifier

Regional qualifiers
There were four regional qualifiers and two last chance qualifiers. The top four teams from each qualifier are shown.

The top team from the Americas, Europe, and CIS qualifiers advanced to the main qualifier and the second to fourth place teams played in their respective Last Chance Qualifiers. The top two Asian teams, which played and Intel Extreme Masters Season X Taipei, advanced to the main qualifier. One team from the Americas Last Chance and two teams from the Europe Last Chance will move on to the main qualifier. There was no Last Chance Qualifier for the Asia region.

The main regional qualifiers were played on LAN while the last chance qualifiers were played online.

Americas Minor
Two teams were invited while another six qualified in the North American qualifier. However, compLexity Gaming could not get a full roster in time, so the team was forced to drop out and the event ran with seven teams. The winner of the Americas Minor would earn a spot in the major qualifier while the three teams that made the bracket stage earned spots in the Americas Last Chance qualifier.

Asia Minor
The Asia qualifier took place at Intel Extreme Masters Season X – Taipei in Taiwan. Two teams were invited and six other teams qualified from their respective regions. TyLoo was disqualified from the event just hours before the tournament was about to start as one of its players, Quanqing "qz" Wu, was found to have been banned for cheating three years prior, which induces an automatic and permanent ban from all Valve-sponsored events. Two teams would earn spots in the major qualifier.

CIS Minor
The CIS qualifier had three teams invited, four teams from a closed qualifier, and one team from a Last Chance qualifier. One team would earn a spot in the major qualifier while the other three teams that made the bracket stage would earn spots in the CIS and Europe Last Chance qualifier.

Europe Minor
The European qualifier eight teams. Four qualifiers to the European qualifier were held and two teams from each qualified for a chance at the major. One team would earn a spot in the major qualifier while the other three teams that made the bracket stage would earn spots in the CIS and Europe Last Chance qualifier.

Americas Last Chance Qualifier
In this Last Chance Qualifier, four teams were invited and the three runners-up from the American qualifier were invited. Only one team would earn a spot in the major qualifier.

Europe and CIS Last Chance Qualifier
Five teams were invited to the Europe and CIS Last Chance Qualifier and the three runners-up from both the Europe and CIS qualifiers were invited. Two teams would earn spots in the major qualifier.

Major qualifier
Like the previous majors, there will be a major qualifier and regional qualifiers. The bottom eight teams from DreamHack Open Cluj-Napoca 2015 received automatic bids to the main qualifier. The other eight teams came from various qualifiers.

Teams were divided into four groups and the top two from each group made it to the major.

Qualifier results
Group A

Group B

Group C

Group D

Broadcast talent
Stage Hosts
 Paul "ReDeYe" Chaloner

Desk Host
 Scott "SirScoots" Smith

Interviewer
 Chris Puckett

Analysts
 Robin "Fifflaren" Johansson
 Richard Lewis
 Jason "moses" O'Toole
 Janko "YNk" Paunović
 Duncan "Thorin" Shields

Commentators
 James Bardolph
 Anders Blume
 Henry "HenryG" Greer
 Daniel "ddk" Kapadia
 Auguste "Semmler" Massonnat
 Matthew "Sadokist" Trivett
 Björn "THREAT" Pers (Guest Commentator for Team Liquid vs Luminosity Gaming)

Observers
 Heather "sapphiRe" Garozzo
 Kevin "kVIN_S" Swift

Broadcasts
All streams were broadcast on Twitch in various languages.

Teams

Pre-Major ranking
The HLTV.org March 28, 2016 ranking, the final one released before MLG Columbus 2016, is displayed below.

†Change since March 21, 2016 ranking

Group stage
The four groups were announced through MLG's social media accounts on March 10–11, 2016. Each group was seeded to contain a team who placed 1st–4th at DreamHack Open Cluj-Napoca 2015, a team who placed 5–8th at DreamHack Open Cluj–Napoca 2015, a team who went undefeated in the offline qualifiers, and a team who won one of the final decider matches in the offline qualifiers.

Group A

Group B

Group C

Group D

Playoffs

The playoffs bracket was announced on March 30, 2016. Each quarterfinals match was seeded to contain one top seed and one second seed from the group stage.

Bracket

Quarterfinals

Natus Vincere vs. Ninjas in Pyjamas
Casters: Anders Blume & Semmler

Astralis vs Fnatic

Casters: James Bardolph & ddk

Team Liquid vs Counter Logic Gaming

Casters: Sadokist & HenryG

Luminosity Gaming vs Virtus.pro

Casters: Anders Blume & Semmler

Semifinals

Natus Vincere vs. Astralis

Casters: Sadokist & HenryG

Team Liquid vs Luminosity Gaming

Casters: James Bardolph, ddk, & THREAT

Finals

Casters: Anders Blume, Semmler, & moses

 was named the MVP of MLG Columbus 2016.

Luminosity Gaming became the first team outside of Europe to win a Major title. Fnatic from Sweden still led all teams with three Majors at the time.

Final standings

The $1,000,000 prize pool was divided up as follows.

Post-Major Ranking
The HLTV.org April 5, 2016 rankings of teams in the major is displayed below. The ranking was the first one released after MLG Columbus 2016.

†Change since March 28, 2016 ranking

References

Counter-Strike: Global Offensive Majors
2016 in esports
2016 in American sports
Events in Columbus, Ohio
2016 in sports in Ohio
Major League Gaming competitions